Formosa Fun Coast (also known as ) was a theme park in Bali District, New Taipei, Taiwan. It closed in the aftermath of 2015 New Taipei water park fire.

History

The theme park was constructed in 1989. On 27 June 2015, a fire killed 15 visitors and injuring hundreds. The park has been closed temporarily to facilitate investigations. On 1 March 2017, the Taipei Administrative High Court decided the park could reopen when the court overturned the government order to suspend its license.

Architecture
The theme park spans over a  area.

Attractions
 Water Park
 Ecology World

Transportation
The theme park is accessible by bus from Guandu Station of Taipei Metro.

2015 cornstarch fire incident

On 27 June 2015, flammable powder, which had been sprayed above the visitors, was set alight during an event hosted by an independent marketing firm leasing space at the park. 508 people were injured, 194 seriously, and 8 of them in critical condition.

On 29 June 2015, a 20-year-old woman died of injuries sustained from burns to more than 90% of her body.

A 19-year-old design student who sustained burns to 90% of his body, was pronounced dead on 2 July 2015.

As of 15 July, seven fatalities were attributed to the fire.

As of 30 July, ten fatalities were attributed to the fire.

On 30th November 2015, the most recent death was announced bringing the total death toll to 15.

See also
 List of tourist attractions in Taiwan

References

External links

 

1989 establishments in Taiwan
Amusement parks opened in 1989
Amusement parks closed in 2015
Defunct amusement parks
Buildings and structures in New Taipei
Tourist attractions in New Taipei
Water parks in Taiwan